The geology of Iceland is unique and of particular interest to geologists. Iceland lies on the divergent boundary between the Eurasian plate and the North American plate. It also lies above a hotspot, the Iceland plume. The plume is believed to have caused the formation of Iceland itself, the island first appearing over the ocean surface about 16 to 18 million years ago. The result is an island characterized by repeated volcanism and geothermal phenomena such as geysers.

The eruption of Laki in 1783 caused much devastation and loss of life, leading to a famine that killed about 25% of the island's population and resulted in a drop in global temperatures, as sulfur dioxide was spewed into the Northern Hemisphere. This caused crop failures in Europe and may have caused droughts in India. The eruption has been estimated to have killed over six million people globally.

Between 1963 and 1967, the new island of Surtsey was created off the southwest coast by a volcanic eruption.

Geologic history

The opening of the North Atlantic and the origin of Iceland 
Iceland is located above the Mid-Atlantic Ridge. Some scientists believe the hotspot beneath Iceland could have contributed to the rifting of the supercontinent Pangaea and the subsequent formation of the North Atlantic Ocean. Igneous rocks which arose from this hotspot have been found on both sides of the Mid-Atlantic Ridge, which originated 57–53 million years ago ("Ma"), around the time North America and Eurasia separated and sea floor spreading began in the Northeast Atlantic. Geologists can determine plate motion relative to the Icelandic hotspot by examining igneous rocks throughout the Northern Atlantic region. This is possible because certain rocks attributable to hotspot volcanism can be interpreted as volcanic traces left by the Iceland hotspot. By assuming that the hotspot is stationary, geologists use what is called the "hotspot frame of reference" to gather plate motion estimates and to create maps of plate movement on the surface of the Earth relative to a stationary hotspot.

Most researchers of plate motion agree that the Iceland hotspot was probably located beneath Greenland for a period of time. As the North Atlantic Ocean continued to spread apart, Greenland was located to the southeast of the Iceland hotspot and likely moved over it 70–40 Ma. Some research using new plate motion data gathered from hotspot reference frames from around the world suggests that the Iceland hotspot's path differs from that estimated from older investigations. Many older rocks (dated 75–70 Ma) located throughout the area to the west are not only located near hypothesized Iceland hotspot paths but are also attributable to hotspot volcanism. This implies that the Iceland hotspot may be much older than the earliest rifting of what is now the northernmost Northeast Atlantic. If this is true, then much of the rifting in the North Atlantic was likely caused by thinning and bulging of the crust as opposed to the more direct influence of the mantle plume which sustains the Iceland hotspot.

In other scientific work on the path of the Iceland hotspot, no such westward track toward Canada (where the aforementioned older igneous rocks exist) can be detected, which implies that the older igneous rocks found in the Northern Atlantic may not have originated from the hotspot. Although the exact path of the Iceland hotspot is debated, a preponderance of geophysical evidence, such as the geothermal heat flux over Greenland, shows that the hotspot likely moved below Greenland around 80–50 Ma.

Around 60–50 Ma, when the hotspot was located near the eastern coast of Greenland and the Mid-Atlantic Ridge, volcanism, perhaps generated by the Iceland hotspot, connected the Eurasian and North American continents and formed a land bridge between the continents while they spread apart. This feature is known as the Greenland Scotland Transverse Ridge, and it now lies below sea level. About 36 Ma, the Iceland hotspot was fully in contact with the oceanic crust and possibly fed segments of the Mid-Atlantic Ridge which continued to form the oldest rocks located directly to the east and west of modern-day Iceland. The oldest sub-aerial rocks in modern-day Iceland are from 16.5 Ma.

Although most scientists believe Iceland is capable of being an island because it is both in contact with a mantle plume, and being actively split apart by the Mid-Atlantic Ridge, some other convincing seismological and geophysical evidence calls the previously discussed mantle plume/hotspot assumption into question. Some geologists believe there is not enough definitive evidence to suggest a mantle plume exists beneath Iceland because sea floor heat flow through the lithosphere surrounding Iceland does not deviate from normal oceanic lithosphere heat flow that is uninfluenced by a plume. This cold crust hypothesis directly opposes the idea that Iceland is located above a hot mantle plume. Additional evidence indicates that seismic waves created under Iceland do not behave as expected based on other seismic surveys near hypothesized mantle plumes. As it is one of the only places where sea floor spreading can be observed on land, and where there is evidence for a mantle plume, the geological history of Iceland will likely remain a popular area of research.

Glaciations
Glacier extent
Nunataks and ice free areas
Interglacials
Tuyas and subglacial volcanism

Holocene changes and volcanism
Revegetation
Increased volcanism
Soil formation
Isostatic rebound
Holocene sediments
Coastal erosion

Rock types

Volcanic deposits

Tholeiitic volcanic series
 Alkalic volcanic series
Hyaloclastite
Tephras and ash

Intrusive rocks
Dikes
Sills
Plutons

Sedimentary deposits
One of the rare examples of sedimentary rocks in Iceland is the sequence of marine and non-marine sediments present on the Tjörnes Peninsula in northern Iceland. These Pliocene and late Pleistocene deposits are composed of silt and sandstones, with fossils preserved in the lower layers. The primary fossil types found in the Tjörnes beds are marine mollusk shells and plant remains (lignite).

Vegetational changes
Past climate
Origin of the strata
Fossil preservation

Active tectonics

The tectonic structure of Iceland is characterized by various seismically and volcanically active centers. Iceland is bordered to the south by the Reykjanes Ridge segment of the Mid-Atlantic Ridge and to the north by the Kolbeinsey Ridge. Rifting in the southern part of Iceland is focused in two main parallel rift zones.  The Reykjanes Peninsula Rift in SW Iceland is the landward continuation of the Reykjanes Ridge that connects to the Western Volcanic Zone (WVZ). The more active Eastern Volcanic Zone (EVZ) represents a rift jump, although it is unclear how the eastward propagation of the main rifting activity has occurred. The offset between the WVZ and the EVZ is accommodated by the South Iceland Seismic Zone, an area characterized by high earthquake activity. The EVZ transitions northward into the Northern Volcanic Zone (NVZ), which contains Krafla volcano. The NVZ is connected to the Kolbeinsey Ridge by the Tjörnes Fracture Zone, another major center of seismicity and deformation.

A great deal of volcanic activity was occurring in the Reykjanes Peninsula in 2020 and into 2021, after nearly 800 years of inactivity. After the eruption of the Fagradalsfjall volcano on 19 March 2021, National Geographic's experts predicted that this "may mark the start of decades of volcanic activity". The eruption was small leading to a prediction that this volcano was unlikely to threaten "any population centers".

Modern glaciers

Glaciers cover about 11% of Iceland; easily the largest of these is Vatnajökull. Icelandic glaciers have generally been retreating over the past 100 years. Vatnajökull has been described as one of the more sensitive glaciers to climate change and has lost as much as 10% of its volume.

As many glaciers overlie active volcanoes, subglacial eruptions can pose hazards due to sudden floods produced by glacial meltwater, known as jökulhlaup. Another subglacial volcanic hazard is the phreatomagmatic eruption. In the case of Iceland, this type of eruption is the cause of massive plumes of volcanic ash that migrate to Europe and disrupt air traffic. Historically these explosive eruptions have had other impacts on human civilization as well, including acid rain and significant changes in weather patterns. Grímsvötn – a major sub-glacial volcano located beneath the Vatnajökull ice cap – is prone to this type of eruption.

Human impact and natural catastrophes
Overgrazing
Soil erosion
Jökulhlaup
Fluorosis
Laki eruption
2008 Iceland earthquake
Deforestation
Geothermal energy use

See also

References

External links

 Maps and illustrative photos  from Union College
 Trønnes, R.G. 2002: Field trip: Introduction. Geology and geodynamics of Iceland. In: S. Planke (ed.) Iceland 2002 – Petroloeum Geology Field Trip Guide, prepared for Statoil Faroes Licence Groups by Volcanic Basin Petroleum Research, Nordic Volcanological Institute and Iceland National Energy Authority, p. 23-43.
 Thor Thordarson. Outline of Geology of Iceland. Chapman Conference 2012 
 Bamlett M. and J. F. Potter (1994) "Iceland".  Geologists' Association Guide No.52.
 Interview of geologist Gro Birkefeldt Møller Pedersen about Iceland's geology, in particular its volcanoes.